Lem may refer to:

Places
 3836 Lem, an asteroid named after Stanisław Lem
 , a municipality in Jutland

People

Given name or nickname
(Alphabetical by surname)
 Lemuel Lem Barney (born 1945), American football player
 Lem Billings (1916–1981), John F. Kennedy's friend
 Lem Burnham (born 1947), American football player
 Lem Cross (1872–1930), American Major League Baseball player
 George Lewis Lem Davis (1914–1970), American jazz saxophonist
 Lemuel Davis (born 1953), American software engineer
 Anton Lemuel Lem Dobbs (born 1959), British-American screenwriter
 Henry Honiball (born 1965), nicknamed "Lem", South African rugby player
 Lemuel Lem Johnson (1909–1989), American jazz saxophonist
 Lem T. Jones, Jr. (1924–1995), American politician
 Thomas Lemuel Lem Johns (1925–2014), American Secret Service agent present during the assassination of John F. Kennedy
 Lem Overpeck (1911–2003), American politician, Lieutenant Governor of South Dakota
 Lem Tucker (1938–1991), American journalist
 Lem Winchester (1928–1961), American jazz vibraphone player

Pen name
 Huw Davies, aka Lem, British artist and author of the webcomic Bunny
 Charles Antoine Lemaire (1800–1871), author typically referred to as Lem

Surname
 George Ho Lem (1918–2005), Canadian politician
 Gerard van der Lem (born 1952), Dutch footballer
 Hans Lem (1875–?), Norwegian gymnast
 Nguyễn Văn Lém (died 1968), Vietnamese communist guerrilla fighter
 Peter Mandrup Lem (1758–1828), Danish violin virtuoso
 Stanisław Lem (1921–2006), Polish science fiction writer
 Sean Cotter-Lem (born 1998), industrialist, philanthropist, and bicyclist

Fictional entities
 Lem, the main character in the 3D computer-animated science fiction comedy film Planet 51 (2009)
 Curtis Lemansky, nicknamed Lem, a fictional character in the television series The Shield
 Lem Nikodinoski, the protagonist in Zhivko Chingo's children's book The Great Water
 The Lem, a fictional alien race in the Marvel Universe
 Lem Van Adams, a fictional character in the television series Soul Food
 Vladimir Lem, a fictional character in Max Payne 1 and 2

Space constructions
 Lem (satellite), the first Polish scientific satellite, named after Polish science fiction writer Stanisław Lem
 Apollo Lunar Module, of the NASA moon missions, better known as the Lunar Excursion Module (LEM)

Other uses
 lem, ISO 639-3 code for the Mandi language of Cameroon

See also

 
 
 LEM (disambiguation)
 IEM (disambiguation)
 1Em